Gap junction alpha-3 protein is a protein that in humans is encoded by the GJA3 gene.

Interactions
GJA3 has been shown to interact with Tight junction protein 1.

References

Further reading

Connexins